The power bandwidth of an amplifier is sometimes taken as the frequency range (or, rarely, the upper frequency limit) for which the rated power output of an amplifier can be maintained (without excessive distortion) to at least half of the full rated power. (Some specifications may mandate 100% of the rated power; sometimes referring to the full-power bandwidth.)

It should not be confused with "half-power" bandwidth, only used in conjunction with filter frequency response curves, where it refers to -3dB points in the frequency response of a band-pass filter.

Data sheets for operational amplifiers often use the term (full-)power bandwidth to indicate the highest frequency at which the achievable peak-to-peak output voltage swing is still equal to the DC output voltage range. This is also sometimes described as the slew-rate-limited bandwidth. The full-power bandwidth  is then related to the slew rate  in volts per micro second and the voltage swing  by

where  is expressed in hertz. In data sheets for commonly available operational amplifiers, slew rate is usually given in volts per microsecond.

Specifying power bandwidth
Power bandwidth may be specified as a frequency range or as a graph.

References

Audio amplifier specifications
Sound
Waves